Micheldorf is a municipality in the district of Sankt Veit an der Glan in the Austrian state of Carinthia.

History
First mentioned in 1074 deed, it consists of the Katastralgemeinden Micheldorf and Lorenzenberg, which from 1973 until a 1992 referendum belonged to the neighbouring town of Friesach. Micheldorf also includes the village of Hirt, home of the Hirt brewery.

Twin towns
 Micheldorf in Oberösterreich, Austria since 2002
 Villesse, Italy since 2003

References

Cities and towns in Sankt Veit an der Glan District